Nokia 5100 is a Nokia GSM mobile phone model that was announced on 4 November 2002 and released in early 2003.

It was marketed as an outdoor device, hence it is in a rubber casing that provides protection against humidity, shocks and dust.  It has some special functions like thermometer, flashlight, calorie counter and loudness meter (dB). It also has a stereo FM radio built in and is Tri-Band with up to 300 hours standby time.

The model type is NPM-6 and it is available in light blue (picture), dark grey, green and orange. It has Xpress-on shells which can be changed.

See also
 List of Nokia products

References

External links
 
 Nokia 5100 user guide

Mobile phones introduced in 2002
Mobile phones introduced in 2003
5100